African Americans have made considerable contributions to the history and development of Jacksonville, Florida. According to the U.S. Census Bureau, the population make up of African American in Jacksonville Florida is 68%.

History

Arrival 
In 1562 Jean Ribault, a French Huguenot explored the St. Johns River and made contact with the native Timucuan Indians. Jean Ribault and the French Huguenots built Fort Caroline along the river at St. Johns Bluff in their first attempts to establish a permanent colony in Florida. St. Augustine, which is the oldest continually occupied settlement in the United States, was founded by Spanish leader Pedro Menendez de Aviles in 1565. The Spanish settled in St. Augustine as a base to attack and capture Fort Carolina. At the time, both the French and Spanish brought in African slaves as laborers. The Huguenot were accompanied by free and enslaved Africans that worked on early fortification. They sawed timber, built churches, a blacksmith shop, and an artillery platform. They also cleared land to grow crops.

Africans In Early Florida  
In October 1687 the first fugitive slave escaped from Carolina and arrived in Florida. Following the kings decree many more enslaved Africans escaped from the Carolinas and found refuge in Florida, promoting royal decree in 1733 reinforcing the offer of freedom, prohibiting the reimbursement of the English for escaped slaves, and requiring of them four years of service to the crown in order to be free. A lot of freedom seekers came to Florida in 1738, Governor Manuel de Montiano gave them land that expanded two miles north of St. Augustine where they could build their own forts. The people became Catholics and adopted Spanish names and Spanish cultures with African decants. Fort Mose became the first African free settlement in North America. The community held thirty-eight men and their families, the men were required to serve in the militia and defend there community in times of attack.

The New Era 
In 1821, the Adams–Onís Treaty ceded Florida to the United States. Laws that were passed to limit a freed slave. The laws that were passed were for African-Americans to not carry a firearm, serve on juries, or testify against whites. They were taxed unfairly and had to have a curfew. They could be whipped for misdemeanors and impressed and forced back in slavery to meet the cost of debts and fines. Whites and blacks to marry was not allowed, the children of the interracial family could not take back land. Florida

Reconstruction and Jim Crow

Racial violence and discrimination was very rough through Jacksonville in the early 1880s to the late 1950s. According to Stewart Tolney and E.M Beck between 1882 and 1930, more African American males would be lynched in Florida then any other Southern state. In this time frame, Florida led the nation with eleven lynches in 1920. Studies showed that for every 100,000 African American in Florida, 79.8 were lynched. Mob violence through Jacksonville was at an all-time high and occurred more than often. One of the most relevant mob violence's was on July 4, 1910, when a group of black people were attacked by white gangs for celebrating boxing champion Jack Johnson defeating Jim Jefferies. Jacksonville also served for the 1912 lynching's when Eugene Baxter, a young black man was a described in a newspaper as a tall light-skinned darkly male was charged with robbing and murdering Simon Silverstein while grocery shopping, including beating his daughter, son, and wife. This made the white people of Jacksonville rage and start rushing the jail that Eugene was held in. The judge that worked this trial sent Eugene far as way as possible until seeing if he was guilty or innocent of this crime to calm down the city of Jacksonville from violence. James Weldon Johnson, an African American leader in the Jacksonville people, stepped in and wanted to put a stop to the hate between blacks and white throughout the community. He came together with the mayor in hopes of making Jacksonville a better and safer place for all people. In this time, James Weldon created opportunities to further blacks financially, spiritually, and emotionally and come together with the white community to unite as one.

Civil Rights era in Jacksonville
The Ax Handle Saturday, also known as the Jacksonville riot on August 27, 1960.  On this day a group of young black teens attempted to sit down at a whites-only lunch counter for hamburgers and egg sandwiches. In the year of 1960, was a year of regular sit-ins for civil rights activist in the south. On this day, more than 200 white men who carried around wooden ax handles viciously attacked innocent, unarmed black protestors. The lunch-in inspired members of the Youth Council of Jacksonville to launch the nonviolent sit-in in Jacksonville. The leader that launch this sit-in in Jacksonville was Rutledge Pearson. Pearson, a young civil rights activist, and history teacher. He would tell his history class that "freedom is not free" and would tell the students to leave their school textbooks at home and he will teach them about black history. Pearson wanted to launch this sit in at Hemming Park, a centerpiece of the downtown shopping district and the center of Charles C. Hemming, a local Civil War veteran who in 1898 donated a towering Confederate monument to the city. Pearson warned his followers in the launch of this sit-in that it could be violent and to not engage in any violence as they proceed in there works for desegregation and equal rights. Pearson was alerted each and everyday by white members of community that if he would go to a sit-in that he would be killed and assaulted, but that never scared Pearson to continue the sit-in. Pearson and the people who followed him at the sit-in were approached and physically and verbally abused along with other blacks that protested by a huge crowd of white men.

Notable African-American landmarks

Kingsley Plantation
The Kingsley Plantation is a historic slavery plantation that was owned by Zephaniah Kingsley and Anna Kingsley who were an interracial couple. Zephaniah Kingsley was a slave trader and a merchant who built a lot of plantation across Florida. Kingsley allowed slaves to buy their freedom in exchange for working for him. Kingsley married Anna Kingsley who was once a slave but freed by Mr. Kingsley. They had four children who all owned and worked on the plantation. When Anna Kingsley turned 18, Mr. Kingsley gave Anna permission to run the plantation until 1821,  when Spanish Florida became Florida territory. Mr. Kingsley had to surrender over his land. Today, the Kingsley Plantation is a historic landmark in Jacksonville, Florida.

Stanton College Preparatory School
The Stanton College Preparatory School started as an elementary school for segregated African American in 1860, but now serves as a high school for grades (9-12). Stanton Preparatory School was started by a group of former slaves to educate their children. The Freedmen's Bureau donated 16,000 to build Stanton Institute with the purpose of training African American women from ages 16–25 to be educators. As of right now the school is ranked 62nd as one of the best schools in the United States and fifth in the state of Florida.

J.P. Small Memorial Stadium  
The J.P. Small Memorial Stadium is home to the stadium built for the Negro Baseball League in 1911.  This field was the first municipal recreation field in the city of Jacksonville. The Joseph H. Durkee family once owned this property and the field original name was the Joseph E. Durkee Athletic Field when it was later changed to the J.P. Small Memorial Stadium. Joseph Durkee was a former Civil War Union officer who settled in Jacksonville following the civil war. This field was played on by the Jacksonville Tars, an African American negro team and the local negro league baseball teams in Jacksonville at the time. The field was also used by the Major League Baseball teams (New York Giants, Brooklyn Dodgers, and more). The most notable African American to play on this field was Hank Aaron who played for the Jacksonville Braves, a minor league team for the Milwaukee Braves at the time. This field is now home to the city of Jacksonville, Florida and used by everyone throughout the state.

Notable people 

A. Philip Randolph - Civil Rights activist (1889-1979)
Corrine Brown - U.S. representative (born 1946)
Alvin Brown - first African-American mayor of Jacksonville, 2011-2015 (born 1961)
James Weldon Johnson - novelist and Civil Rights activist (1871-1938)
Mary McLeod Bethune - educator, Civil Rights activist (1875–1955)
Derrick Henry - NFL player (born 1994)
Bob Hayes - NFL player, Olympic gold medalist sprinter (1942-2002)
Brian Dawkins - NFL player (born 1973) 
Artis Gilmore - NBA player (born 1949)

References